CEW may refer to:

 Center on Education and the Workforce, a research institute affiliated with Georgetown University in Washington, DC
 Clinton Engineer Works, a Manhattan Project plant
 Conducted electrical weapon (CEW), a weapon that delivers an electrical shock
 Cosmetic Executive Women, a trade organization for the personal care industry
 The IATA code for Bob Sikes Airport

See also
 CEWS (disambiguation)